Dander is material shed from the body of humans and other animals that have fur, hair, or feathers. The term is similar to dandruff, when an excess of flakes becomes visible. Skin flakes that come off the main body of an animal are dander, while the flakes of skin called dandruff come from the scalp and are composed of epithelial skin cells. The surface layer of mammalian skin is called the stratum corneum, which is shed as part of normal skin replacement.

Dander is microscopic, and can be transported through the air in house dust, where it forms the diet of the dust mites. Through the air, dander can enter the mucous membranes in the nose and lungs, causing allergies in susceptible individuals, largely through the mechanism of allergy to proteins in the bodies of the dust mites that live on dander. Dander builds up in carpets and in mattresses and pillows, so smooth surfaces predispose to an environment where levels of dander can be controlled more easily.   
More pet dander is sloughed off in older animals than in younger animals. Dander build up can be a cause of allergies, such as allergic rhinitis, in humans. Dr. Paivi Salo, an allergy expert at the National Institute of Health, states that "airborne allergies affect approximately 10-30% of adults and 40% of children." Damp dusting and vacuum cleaners with sealed bodies and fitted with HEPA filters reduce re-distribution of the dander dust, with associated dust mites, into the air.

 has it that dander is a dialect synonym of dandruff, possibly from Yorkshire in England.

See also
Allergy to cats
Allergy to dogs
Dandruff
Powder down

References

External links

 http://www.lung.org/our-initiatives/healthy-air/indoor/indoor-air-pollutants/pet-dander.html

Animal physiology
Mammal anatomy